Jutta Hipp (February 4, 1925 – April 7, 2003) was a jazz pianist and composer. Born in Leipzig during the Weimar Republic, Hipp initially listened to jazz in secret, as it was not approved of by the Nazi authorities. After World War II, she became a refugee, often lacking food and other necessities. By the early 1950s, she was a touring pianist and soon led her own bands. Critic Leonard Feather heard Hipp perform in Germany in 1954, recorded her, and organized her move to the United States the following year. Club and festival appearances soon followed, as did album releases.

For reasons that are unclear, Hipp's last recording was in 1956. She started working in a clothing factory, and ultimately cut herself off from the music world. She remained in the United States, and worked for the clothing company for 35 years.

Early life
Hipp was born on February 4, 1925, in Leipzig in the Weimar Republic. Her family was middle class, with a Protestant background. She began playing the piano at the age of nine and studied painting in Germany. Jazz was disapproved of by the Nazi regime, but Hipp listened to it during "clandestine gatherings in friends' homes and [...] during bombing raids. Instead of joining her parents and brother in the basement shelter [...] she hunkered down in front of the radio transcribing jazz tunes played on forbidden radio stations." She studied at the Leipzig Academy of Graphic Arts before moving as a refugee to the western zones of Germany in 1946 after Russia occupied Leipzig.

Career
"After the war she became a displaced person and suffered from malnutrition and lacked most basic necessities", wrote Marc Myers for Jazz Wax. She had a son, Lionel, in 1948, named after Lionel Hampton. He was fathered by an African-American GI. As African-American GIs at that time could not accept paternity to white women, the identity of Lionel's father is unknown. Hipp soon gave up her son for adoption.

Hipp worked with saxophonist Hans Koller from 1951, touring in Germany and other countries. They recorded together in 1952. In Germany she also led a quintet between 1953 and 1955; Albert Mangelsdorff's brother Emil was a member of the group. In 1954, Hipp played with Attila Zoller. In January of the same year, critic Leonard Feather heard Hipp in Germany, around three years after being sent a recording of her playing by one of her friends. He booked an April recording session for her; the resulting album was released two years later. Later in 1954, Hipp played at the Deutsches Jazzfestival in Frankfurt.

Hipp immigrated to the United States in 1955, where she spent the rest of her life. Feather arranged a visa for Hipp, and found her a job as a pianist at the Hickory House club in New York. She played a residency there for six months from March 1956. She played at the Newport Jazz Festival in the same year and recorded for the Blue Note label with Feather's help; the label released two LPs recorded at the Hickory House in April 1956. An album with saxophonist Zoot Sims, was her final recording.

One story, recounted in The Daily Telegraph obituary is that drummer Art Blakey asked her to play with his band one night at the Café Bohemia, but "she refused, saying she was drunk, and anyway did not think she was good enough. Blakey dragged her to the piano, and started playing at a furious tempo which she could not handle. Blakey then addressed the audience: 'Now you see why we don't want these Europeans coming over here and taking our jobs!'"

"Hipp was a rather shy individual who suffered from severe stage fright throughout her career and drowned her fears with excessive alcohol and life-long chain smoking." She may have regarded playing the piano as a way of making money in difficult post-war circumstances rather than as an artistic vocation. As it became more difficult to earn enough money as a jazz musician, Hipp may have decided to take a more stable job. She worked in a clothing factory, continued to play on weekends, but started working for Wallachs clothing company in 1960, where she stayed for 35 years. Some reports stated that she was a seamstress, but a later account indicates that she "prepare[d] frayed or torn men's pants for alterations". Feather may have desired a romantic involvement with Hipp and been rejected, but this is unlikely to have been the reason for the rapid decline of her musical career.

Hipp also returned to her first interest of painting. In 1995, the "German magazine Jazz Podium reproduced her painted caricatures of some jazz musicians; Hipp commented that, "With painting, they look at the work, not you".

Hipp cut herself off from the music industry. She suffered from depression and struggled to maintain relationships. Around 1986, she restarted giving interviews. Until 2000, Blue Note did not know where to send her royalty checks. Lee Konitz was one of a few musicians who kept in touch with her until her death in Queens. Hipp died of pancreatic cancer on April 7, 2003, in her apartment in Sunnyside, Queens. She never married, but was once engaged to Attila Zoller. The New York Times obituary stated that "Hipp has no known survivors", although her son was still alive and living in Germany in 2013.

Playing style
Hipp's original influence was Lennie Tristano. She was criticized at an early stage for being too similar in style to Horace Silver's blues-based rhythms, having left cool jazz and bebop behind. Ben Ratliff, in The New York Times 2003 obituary, wrote that Hipp "developed a style that was lean, percussive, swinging and interrupted with plenty of rests, not far from Horace Silver's style but more low-key." The Penguin Guide to Jazz observed that Hipp is "not as easy to pigeonhole as some accounts suggest. There are extra notes in many of the chords that give them a tense, slightly jangling quality, but Hipp was also capable of playing with delicate lyricism [...] and with a rugged, funky edge".

Legacy
After her death, Hipp became of some interest as a female instrumentalist in the New York jazz scene.

In 2011, a street in Leipzig was named after Hipp – Jutta-Hipp-Weg.

Discography

As leader/co-leader

References

External links
Jutta Hipp at bluenote.com
Aaron Gilbreath essay on Hipp
 Interview with Hipp
"Jutta Hipp" at Jazz Podium, July/August 2006
Jutta Hipp artwork, Institute of Jazz Studies, Rutgers University

1925 births
2003 deaths
Bebop pianists
Blue Note Records artists
Cool jazz pianists
German jazz pianists
Musicians from Leipzig
20th-century pianists
20th-century German musicians
Women jazz pianists
German emigrants to the United States
20th-century women pianists